Charles Victor Woirgard (16 October 1764, Metz - 19 February 1810, Valverde), also known by the surname of Beaugard or Beauregard, was a French général de brigade of the French Revolutionary Wars and Napoleonic Wars. His name is engraved on the 38th column of the Arc de Triomphe as Beauregard.

1764 births
1810 deaths
French military personnel of the French Revolutionary Wars
French military personnel killed in the Napoleonic Wars
Names inscribed under the Arc de Triomphe